The Heart Beats were an American all-female garage rock band, based in Lubbock, Texas, and founded around 1966.  They were led by drummer and lead vocalist Linda Sanders, along with younger sister Debbie Sanders (guitar), Debbie McMellan (bass guitar), and Jeannie Foster (guitar and keyboards).  The Sanders sisters met McMellan and Foster in a music class when Debbie Sanders was about ten years old and the other girls were about 12 or 13.  The Sanders' mother Jeanne Sanders became the band's manager, supervising them closely to "maintain in appearance and reality a group of decent, wholesome girls."

Linda Sanders later wrote: "Our mom always knew what potential we had, but I don't think we ever really realized it. She saw our talent and our uniqueness as an all girl band. She thought we could really go places and become well known. Her faith and dreams in us proved to be a reality."

The Heart Beats were at the time one of just a few all-female rock and roll bands anywhere in the world.  They attracted nationwide attention in the summer of 1968, when they won the battle of the bands on the popular ABC-TV variety show Happening 68, hosted by Mark Lindsay and Paul Revere of Paul Revere & the Raiders.  Their winning performance was a cover version of the Outsiders' "Time Won't Let Me". Mrs. Sanders turned down a recording deal with ABC Records because she wanted her daughters to stay in school, but the band put another prize, a Volkswagen mini-bus to good use.  The VW became the band's tour bus.

They recorded at Robin Hood Brians' in Tyler, TX which was released on their own "Heart Beats" label in early 1969. The A-side, "Cryin' Inside" was co-written by the legendary Texas singer-songwriter Ronnie (Mouse) Weiss. Later in the year they recorded 2 songs with Norman Petty in his Clovis, NM studio although the songs went unreleased. They were written by Linda's husband, who had also been her music teacher. After he was killed in a car accident in 1971, the songs were released as a commemorative single on their own label as "Linda Kennington & The Heart Beats".

Although they never signed a national recording contract, the Heart Beats became a popular regional attraction, and they stayed together until the 1980s.

References

All-female bands
Garage rock groups from Texas
Musical groups from Lubbock, Texas